The Old Brick Capitol in Washington, D.C., served as the temporary Capitol of the United States from 1815 to 1819. The building was a private school, a boarding house, and, during the American Civil War, a prison known as the Old Capitol Prison.  It was demolished in 1929, and its site is now occupied by the U.S. Supreme Court building.

Site history
The site, as with most of Capitol Hill, was part of Jenkins Hill and was acquired from the Carroll family to accommodate the U.S. Capitol. Located at 1st and A streets NE in Washington, D.C., on the eastern slope of Capitol Hill, the site's first building was a red brick tavern and hostel called Stelle's Hotel, built around 1800. It was part of a neighborhood of rooming houses catering to the U.S. Congress.

Temporary U.S. Capitol, 1815–1819

In August 1814, during the War of 1812, the British burned the nearby United States Capitol building. The Congress, forced to meet in temporary quarters, pulled down the hostel at 1st and A streets, and built a temporary brick capitol building in the Federal style, laying the cornerstone on July 4, 1815. Congress then occupied the brick capitol from December 8, 1815, until 1819, while the original U.S. Capitol Building was rebuilt. The first inauguration of President James Monroe took place at the brick capitol on March 4, 1817.

The building was actually financed by Washington real-estate investors, who had heard rumors that some members of Congress were considering relocation of the national capital in the aftermath of the burning. The investors wanted to prevent their land values from decreasing by keeping the government in Washington.

Old Brick Capitol, 1819–1861
The building acquired the title "Old Brick Capitol" in 1819 when Congress and the Supreme Court returned to the restored U.S. Capitol Building. Until the time of the Civil War, the building was used as a private school, then as a boarding house. South Carolina Senator and former Vice President of the United States John C. Calhoun,  who had been a leading member of the Fourteenth Congress when it met in the Old Brick Capitol, died in the boarding house in 1850.

Old Capitol Prison, 1861–1867

With the start of the Civil War in 1861, the Union repurchased the building to use as a prison for captured Confederates, as well as political prisoners, spies, Union officers convicted of insubordination, and local prostitutes. Famous inmates of the prison included Rose Greenhow, Belle Boyd, John Mosby, and Henry Wirz, who was hanged in the yard of the prison.

Many people arrested following the assassination of President Abraham Lincoln were also held here. These included Dr. Samuel Mudd, Mary Surratt, Louis Weichmann, and John T. Ford, owner of Ford's Theater, where Lincoln was shot. The adjoining row of houses, Duff Green's Row, was also used as part of the prison.

Post-War use and demolition
The government sold the Old Capitol Prison in 1867 to George T. Brown, then sergeant-at-arms of the U.S. Senate, who modified the building into three rowhouses collectively known as "Trumbull's Row." In the 20th century, they were used as the headquarters of the National Woman's Party. In 1929, the site was acquired by eminent domain and the brick building was razed to clear the site for the U.S. Supreme Court Building.

See also
List of Civil War POW Prisons and Camps

References

External links
Detailed article on the prison
Washington Star Article

Sources

 James M. Goode, Capital Losses: A Cultural History of Washington's Destroyed Buildings, Washington: Smithsonian Institution (2003).
 Harold H. Burton and Thomas E. Waggaman, "The Story of the Place: Where First and A Streets Formerly Met at What Is Now the Site of the Supreme Court Building, Records of the Columbia Historical Society, Washington, D.C., vol. 51/52 (1951/1952).

Former national capitol buildings in the United States
American Civil War prison camps
Washington, D.C., in the American Civil War
Defunct prisons in Washington, D.C.
Federal architecture in Washington, D.C.
Demolished buildings and structures in Washington, D.C.
Buildings and structures demolished in 1929
1815 establishments in Washington, D.C.
1929 disestablishments in Washington, D.C.